This list of museums in Worcestershire, England contains museums which are defined for this context as institutions (including nonprofit organizations, government entities, and private businesses) that collect and care for objects of cultural, artistic, scientific, or historical interest and make their collections or related exhibits available for public viewing. Also included are non-profit art galleries and university art galleries. Virtual museums are not included in this list.

Museums

Defunct museums
 Bromsgrove Museum, Bromsgrove

References

See also
:Category:Tourist attractions in Worcestershire

 
Worcestershire
Museums